Agrocybe is a genus of mushrooms in the family Strophariaceae (previously placed in the Bolbitiaceae). The genus has a widespread distribution, and contains about 100 species.

Distribution

Mushroom cultivation began with the Romans and Greeks, who grew the small Agrocybe aegerita. The Romans believed that fungi fruited when lightning struck.
In Europe, toxic forms are not normally found, but Agrocybe molesta could be confused with poisonous white Agaricus species or with poisonous Amanita species.

The  edible southern species Agrocybe aegerita is commonly known as the Poplar mushroom, Chestnut mushroom or Velvet pioppino (Chinese: 茶樹菇). It is a white rot fungus and is a medium-sized agaric with a convex, almost flat, cap 3 to 10 cm in diameter. Underneath, it has numerous whitish radial plates adherent to the foot, later turning to a brownish-gray color, and light elliptic spores of 8-11 by 5-7 micrometres. The white fiber foot is generally curved, having a membraneous ring on the top part which promptly turns to tobacco color due to the falling spores. When very young, its color may be reddish-brown and later turn to a light brown color, more ocher toward the center and whiter around its border. It grows in tufts on logs and holes in the poplars, and other trees of large leaves It is cultivated and sold in Japan, Korea, Australia and China. It is an important valuable source possessing varieties of bioactive secondary metabolites such as indole derivatives with free radical scavenging activity, cylindan with anticancer activity, and also agrocybenine with antifungal activity.

Agrocybe farinacea of Japan, a species closely related to Agrocybe putaminum, has been reported to contain the hallucinogen psilocybin; however, there has been no recent chemical analysis carried out on this mushroom, nor any modern reports of psychoactivity.

Selected list of species

See also

 List of psilocybin mushrooms
 Psilocybin mushroom

References

External links
 Mushroom Expert's Information on Agrocybe Genus

Strophariaceae
Agaricales genera
Taxa described in 1889